Lesbian, gay, bisexual, and transgender (LGBT) persons in Turkey face legal challenges not experienced by non-LGBT residents, though Turkey's LGBT rights are considered to be relatively progressive when compared to most other Muslim-majority countries.

In 1858, the Ottoman Empire—the predecessor of the modern-day Republic of Turkey— adopted a new penal code, which no longer contained any explicit articles criminalizing homosexuality, sodomy, and köçeklik (young male slave dancers). The Ottoman Penal Code of 1858 was heavily influenced by the Napoleonic Code, as part of wider reforms during the Tanzimat period. LGBT people have had the right to seek asylum in Turkey under the Geneva Convention since 1951, but same-sex couples are not given the same legal protections available to heterosexual couples. Transgender people have been allowed to change their legal gender since 1988. Although discrimination protections regarding sexual orientation and gender identity or expression have been debated legally, they have not yet been legislated.

History 

In the 1980s, the national government, whether democratically elected or as a result of a coup d'état, opposed the existence of a visible LGBT community, especially within the political context.

Some openly gay people were able to be successful in the 1980s. Murathan Mungan has been openly gay throughout his professional life as a successful poet and writer. However, many gay and bisexual men who lived during this period have since said in interviews that they felt pressured by social attitudes and government policy to remain in the closet about their sexual identity.

In the 1980s, the Radical Democratic Green Party expressed support for gay rights, including the work of a group of transgender people to protest police brutality. However, it was not until the 1990s that many members of the LGBT community in Turkey began to organise on behalf of their human rights.

In 1993, Lambda Istanbul was created to campaign on behalf of LGBT rights in Turkey. In 1994, the Freedom and Solidarity Party banned discrimination on the basis of sexual orientation and gender identity within the party and nominated Demet Demir, a leading voice of the community, to successfully become the first transgender candidate for the local council elections in Istanbul.

In 1993, organisers were denied permission to hold an LGBT pride parade. Similar opposition was expressed by the government in 1995 and 1996 for an LGBT film festival and academic conference. Government officials cited vaguely worded laws designed to protect public morality as justification for refusing to allow these public events to take place.

In 1996, the Supreme Court overturned a lower court's ruling and removed a child from her lesbian mother on the grounds that homosexuality is "immoral".

Throughout the 1990s, reports by IHD, Turkey's Human Rights Association as well as international human rights organizations such as Amnesty International stated that transgender people were frequently harassed and beaten by police officers. One article even stated that police had set fire to an apartment block with many transgender people residing there.

Reports of harassment and violence against LGBT people still occur in the twenty-first century. In 2008, a gay Kurdish-Turk student, Ahmet Yıldız, was shot outside a café by his father and later died in the hospital. Sociologists have called this Turkey's first publicised gay honour killing. The wish of the Turkish Government to join the European Union has put some pressure on the government to grant official recognition to LGBT rights. The report on progress in Turkey for the accession to the European Union of 14 October 2009, the European Commission for Enlargement wrote:
The legal framework is not adequately aligned with the EU acquis...
Homophobia has resulted in cases of physical and sexual violence. The killing of several transsexuals and transvestites is a worrying development. Courts have applied the principle of 'unjust provocation' in favour of perpetrators of crimes against transsexuals and transvestites.

Turkey became the first Muslim-majority country in which a gay pride march was held. In Istanbul (since 2003) and in Ankara (since 2008) gay marches are being held each year with an increasing numbers of participation. The gay pride march in Istanbul started with 30 people in 2003, and in 2010, there were 5,000. The pride parades in 2011 and 2012 were attended by more than 15,000 participants.

On 30 June 2013, Istanbul Pride parade attracted almost 100,000 people. The protesters were joined by Gezi Park protesters, making the 2013 Istanbul Pride the biggest pride event ever held in Turkey. The 2014 Istanbul pride attracted more than 100,000 people. The 2015, 2016, 2017, and 2018 pride parades were banned by local authorities, and participants were faced with police attacks. In June 2013, the first Izmir Pride took place with 2,000 participants. On 3 June 2018, the 6th Izmir Pride Parade peacefully took place with over 50,000 participants. Another pride took place in Antalya. Politicians from the main opposition party, CHP and another opposition party, BDP also lent their support to the demonstration. The pride march in Istanbul does not receive any support of the municipality or the government.

In 2009, amateur football referee Halil İbrahim Dinçdağ came out as gay and was subsequently banned from refereeing football matches. In December 2015, the Turkish Football Federation was ordered to pay 23,000 lira in compensation for dismissing Dinçdağ.

On 21 September 2011, the Minister of Family and Social Policies Fatma Şahin met with an LGBT organisation. She said that the government will actively work together with LGBT organisations. She submitted a proposal for the acceptance of LGBT individuals in the new constitution that Parliament planned to draft in the coming year. She was calling on Members of Parliament to handle the proposal positively. She asserted that "if freedom and equality is for everybody, then sexual orientation discrimination should be eliminated and the rights of these LGBT citizens should be recognised."

On 9 January 2012, a columnist named Serdar Arseven for an Islamist newspaper called Yeni Akit wrote an article calling LGBT people perverts. The Court of Cassation penalised Yeni Akit with 4,000 TL fine and Serdar Arseven with 2,000 TL for hate speech.

In May 2012, the BDP requested the writers of the new Turkish constitution to include same-sex marriage in that constitution. It was rejected by the biggest party in the Turkish Parliament, the AKP, and an opposition party, MHP, while supported by the main opposition party, the CHP.

On 29 May 2013, a parliamentary research motion regarding LGBT rights in Turkey was proposed and discussed in the parliament of Turkey. Despite support from pro-Kurdish BDP, secularist CHP, and the abstention of Turkish nationalist party MHP, the motion was rejected by votes of the ruling party AKP. AKP MP Türkan Dağoğlu cited the scientific articles on homosexuality published in the US in 1974 and said, "Homosexuality is an abnormality. Same-sex marriages may not be allowed. It would cause social deterioration." For the research motion, CHP MP Binnaz Toprak said, "In the 1970s there were scientists suggesting that black people were not as smart as white people in the US. Hence the science of today doesn't accept the findings of those times. Your sayings can not be allowed."

On 12 August 2013, the Constitutional Reconciliation Commission, which was drafting a new constitution of the Republic and was composed of four major parliamentary parties including Kurds, secularists, Islamists and nationalists, agreed to provide constitutional protection against discrimination for LGBT individuals. The draft was later cancelled.

On 17 July 2014, Turkey's Supreme Court ruled that referring to gays as "perverted" constitutes hate speech.

In November 2016, Turkey, along with Georgia, Israel, Japan, Mongolia, Nepal, the Philippines, South Korea, Sri Lanka, Thailand, East Timor and Vietnam, were the only Asian countries in the United Nations to vote in favor of the appointment of an independent expert to raise awareness of the discrimination faced by the LGBT community and to find ways to properly protect them.

In June 2018, the embassy of Turkey, along with ambassadors from 51 countries have signed an open letter of support for LGBT rights in Poland.

Legality of same-sex relations

Gay sexual conduct between consenting adults in private is not a crime in Turkey. The criminal code also has vaguely worded prohibitions on "public exhibitionism," and "offenses against public morality" that can be used to harass gay and transgender people. Individual towns and cities are given some leeway in enacting local laws designed to protect 'public morality'.

Recognition of same-sex relationships
Turkey does not recognise same-sex marriages, civil unions or domestic partnership benefits.

Military service

In Turkey, compulsory military service applies to all male Turkish citizens between the ages of 18 and 41. However, the Turkish military openly discriminates against homosexuals by barring them from serving in the military. At the same time, Turkey – in violation of its obligations under the European Convention on Human Rights – withholds any recognition of conscientious objection to military service. Some objectors must instead identify themselves as "sick" – and some were forced to undergo what Human Rights Watch calls "humiliating and degrading" examinations to "prove" their homosexuality.

In October 2009 the report of the EU Commission on Enlargement stated: "The Turkish armed forces have a health regulation which defines homosexuality as a 'psychosexual' illness and identifies homosexuals as unfit for military service. Conscripts who declare their homosexuality have to provide photographic proof. A small number have had to undergo humiliating medical examinations."

In November 2015, the Turkish Armed Forces removed the clause stating that a draftee must "prove" their homosexuality. Draftees may decide to disclose their sexuality verbally and receive an 'unfit report' during their medical examination which exempts them from service, or must not disclose their orientation in any form for a year if a military doctor agrees to grant them a 'fit report' and serve their conscription. Those who disclose their homosexuality and receive an 'unfit report' may be subject to future discrimination in public life as the military's record of homosexuals in the drafting process has resulted in several cases of public leaks. Homosexuality remains grounds for expulsion for commissioned officers, non-commissioned officers and military students under the Turkish Armed Forces Discipline Law.

There is little support in the army in favour of greater acceptance; in a 2015 study asking 1,300 officers "whether homosexuals should be allowed to serve in the army", 96.3% answered negatively.

Discrimination protections

No laws exist yet in Turkey that protect LGBT people from discrimination in employment, education, housing, health care, public accommodations or credit. In October 2009, the report of the EU Commission on Enlargement stated:
There have been several cases of discrimination at the workplace, where LGBT employees have been fired because of their sexual orientation. Provisions of the Turkish Criminal Code on 'public exhibitionism' and 'offences against public morality' are sometimes used to discriminate against LGBT people. The Law on Misdemeanours is often used to impose fines against transgender persons.

In 2011, Öykü Evren Özen, a transgender woman from the northwestern province of Bursa, has become a candidate for deputy from the main opposition party, Republican People's Party, or CHP. She was the first transgender lawmaker of Turkey during the general elections.

The main opposition, CHP, proposed gay rights to the Turkish parliament on 14 February 2013.

Lesbian, gay, bisexual and transgender (LGBT) individuals are among the most vulnerable asylum seekers and refugees in Turkey today. Their access to rights and services is limited in Turkey as a result of anti-LGBT sentiments of state actors and the general public.

In August 2013, three major political parties in the parliament including the secularist CHP which worked with BDP on the matter, conservative AKP and nationalist MHP, has agreed to provide constitutional protection against discrimination for LGBT people. The draft was later canceled due to nonconcurrences regarding other subjects in the new constitutional draft.

Can Çavuşoğlu, a Turkish activist, has launched a campaign as the first openly gay mayoral candidate of Turkey, Çavuşoğlu announced a bid to run in the Black Sea region, a town of Bulancak, Giresun, home to about 60,000, in the March 2014 local elections.

In February 2015, the main opposition CHP introduced a bill to prohibit discrimination based on sexual orientation and gender identity in both public and private sectors. The bill seeks equal recruitment, pay, promotion, dismissal in the workplace and reforms in the Turkish Armed Forces Code of Discipline that would allow members of the military to serve openly.

In 2015, pro-LGBT Kurdish, Peoples' Democratic Party publicly announced that they will have LGBT and Feminist candidates. Barış Sulu, the left-wing People's Democratic Party (HDP) candidate, becomes the first openly gay man to run for the Turkish parliament.

In January 2019, the 34th Labor Court in Istanbul issued the first verdict in a legal case surrounding three men working at garbage who were fired by a municipality for allegedly engaging in a homosexual relationship with one of their co-workers. The court ruled in favour of one of the plaintiffs, identified as R.S., concluding that his contract was unjustly terminated. Three drivers of the garbage trucks owned by the Kağıthâne Municipality in Istanbul were fired by their employer after it was alleged last year that they were in a gay relationship with a 27-year-old garbage collector. The garbage collector, identified only as M.Ş., had told the authorities that he had engaged in sexual relationship "from time to time" with the three truck drivers. The drivers, aged between 43 and 51, had sued the municipality and its subcontractor in April 2018, citing what they described as unjust termination of their contract.

The 34th Labour Court in Istanbul ruled on 29 January in favor of one of the plaintiffs, identified as R.S., concluding that his contract was unjustly terminated. His attorney had told the court that the plaintiff "had got nothing to do with that incident," while the company lawyers had claimed that his dismissal was part of "rightful termination" due to the sexual relationship at work. If the ruling is approved in the appeals process, too, the subcontractor will be forced to return the plaintiff to his previous job or to compensate him. A hearing for one of the other two cases, which still continue, was held in February.

Gender identity and expression

In Turkey, the minimum age required to get sex reassignment surgery is 18. In order for one to change one's gender section on an identity card, the procedure must be conducted at a state hospital. Sex reassignment surgery is available in Turkey's major cities like Istanbul, Ankara, Izmir and Antalya.

Media regulations

LGBT-themed movies are not banned in Turkey. Brokeback Mountain, as an example, was seen in Turkish cinemas without any government censorship. Anyone eighteen years of age or older could buy a ticket to watch the film.

LGBT-themed DVDs can also be legally sold in Turkey, albeit DVDs with sexually explicit content may only be sold to people eighteen years of age or older.

In 2013, a Turkish vendor was charged with selling "immoral" DVDs because the DVD movies featured gay sexually explicit content. Judge Mahmut Erdemli from the court in Istanbul overturned the criminal charges. He ruled that gay sex is natural, stated that an individual's sexual orientation should be respected, and cited examples of same-sex marriages in Europe and in the Americas.

Restriction of expression
In Turkey, everyone has the constitutionally protected right to hold a peaceful protest without prior permission, so long as the topic of the protest is not explicitly banned by law. Even though there are not any laws explicitly forbidding LGBT-related protests, the Istanbul Pride parade in June 2015, which overlapped with the Muslim holy fasting month of Ramadan, was banned by the Istanbul governorship hours before the event over "security concerns". Soon after, it was shut down through police intervention for the first time in its 13-year history. The parade had taken place the previous year during Ramadan without issue. In 2016, it was banned again and arrests were made as participants tried to hold the rally regardless of the prohibition. It was banned again in 2017, and in 2018 it was banned again and arrests were made as participants tried to hold the rally regardless of the prohibition. It was banned again in 2019. In 2020, due to the COVID-19 pandemic, it was held online with no official interference.

In 2017, the capital city of Ankara banned all LGBT or LGBT rights related events, under the pretext of providing "peace and security", with officials saying that such "exhibitions" could cause different groups of society to "publicly harbor hatred and hostility" towards each other; on the other hand news media noted that the ban came in the context of the steady erosion of civil liberties in Turkey following the failed 2016 coup attempt.

In Ankara, all public LGBTI-related discussions are banned. In November 2017, the Ankara governor's office under state of emergency imposed an indefinite ban on LGBTI-focused public events. The emergency rule ended in July 2018; however, the ban was still not lifted. In October 2018, the government extended the ban to LGBTI-focused events generally without giving any idea about the end date. In May 2019, police in Ankara violently ended a student-led Pride march at the Middle East Technical University (METU). According to a report from Amnesty International, authorities arrested 25 students during that.

In June 2019, the 7th Izmir Pride, the 3rd Antalya Pride and the 27th Istanbul pride were banned by the cities governors. Amnesty International last week called for Turkey to lift the Pride bans. However, days later a court suspended Izmir pride week ban. In June 2019, 17 people were detained during press statement over Pride ban in Turkish police dispersed a crowd gathered in the city of Izmir for a public press statement over the governorate's pride parade ban and detained 17 people, after the group read their press statement.

On 25 June 2019, the Governorship of Mersin banned all LGBT events to be held in the province for 20 days under the Turkish Law on Meetings and Demonstrations "with the aim of maintaining public well-being and public peace, preventing crimes and protecting public health, public morality and safety of life and property of citizens." The ban went in effect in the 5th Mersin Pride Week, which was to be held between 1–7 July.

Public opinion
According to a survey conducted by the Kadir Has University in Istanbul in 2016, 33 per cent of people said that LGBT people should have equal rights. This increased to 45 per cent in 2020. Another survey by Kadir Has University in 2018 found that 55.3 percent of people would not want a homosexual neighbour. This decreased to 46.5 per cent in 2019.

Attitudes towards the legalization of same-sex unions in Turkey are mixed. A 2015 poll by Ipsos found that 27% of the Turkish public was in favor of legalizing same-sex marriage, while 19% preferred civil unions instead. 25% of those surveyed were against any form of legal recognition for same-sex couples and 29% stated that they did not know which option to choose.
{| class="wikitable"
|+Ipsos Results
!Statement
!Agree
|-
|"Same-sex couples should be allowed to marry legally."|align="left" style="background: #16E021" |27%
|-
|"Same-sex couples should be allowed to obtain some kind of legal recognition, but not to marry."|align="left" style="background: #a7fcab" |19%
|-
|"Same-sex couples should not be allowed to marry orobtain any kind of legal recognition."|align="left" style="background: #FA6E79" | 25% 
|-
|Undecided'|29%
|-
|Total|100%
|}

According to the 2020 Pew Research, 25% of the Turks said homosexuality should be accepted by society, with 57% opposing it. The acceptance was higher among educated people (41%) and young Turks (34%).

Living conditions
Homosexuality is a taboo subject in Turkey and the culture of "honour killings" can be observed in Turkish society families murdering members (usually female) who engage in sexual behaviours regarded by some as morally inappropriate. The murder of Ahmet Yıldız, a 26-year-old Kurdish-Turk gay man from Şanlıurfa, may be the first known example of an honour killing with a gay male victim. Studies for the years 2007–09 prepared by the German Democratic Turkey Forum show 13 killings in 2007, 5 in 2008 and at least 4 killings in 2009 related to the sexual identity of the victims. On 21 May 2008 the New York-based organization Human Rights Watch published a report entitled "We Need a Law for Liberation". The report documents how gay men and transgender people face beatings, robberies, police harassment, and the threat of murder. Human Rights Watch found that, in most cases, the response by the authorities is inadequate if not nonexistent. In case of hate murders against homosexuals, courts apply the condition of "heavy provocation" and lower sentences.

In Turkey prejudice against homosexuals is common in many areas. Due to common prejudices against homosexuals, since the early 2000s, administrative institutions have carried out many discriminatory practices such as police raids on gay bars, closure of LGBTI+ associations, raids on gay individuals home, magazines and website censors. Similarly, in the 2010s, prohibitions on all LGBT events in province were made. According to the research of KAOS GL, 27% of LGBT people who did not hide their sexual identity were discriminated against in the recruitment process in 2017, 8% in 2018, 11% in 2019. The study stated that LGBT people, who think that the institutions they apply for are biased, are more inclined to hide their sexual identity, so this rate will be higher if the applicants open to employers.

LGBT civil rights organisations

The major LGBT community-based civil rights organisation is KAOS GL, established in 1994 in Ankara by students including Yasemin Öz. Lambdaistanbul, a member of ILGA-Europe, established in 1993 in Istanbul, was sued on the charges of acting against public morality. The prosecution argued that its name and activities were "against the law and morality." That ruling, sharply criticised by Human Rights Watch, was finally overturned by the country's Supreme Court of Appeal on 22 January 2009.

During the early 1990s, the organisations' proposals for cooperation were refused by the Government Human Rights Commission. April 1997, when members of Lambda Istanbul were invited to the National Congress on AIDS, marked the first time a Turkish LGBT organisation was represented at the government level. During the early 2000s (decade), new organisations began to be form in cities other than Istanbul and Ankara, like the Pink Life LGBT Association in Ankara, the Rainbow Group in Antalya and Piramid LGBT Diyarbakır Initiative in Diyarbakır.

In 1996, another LGBT organisation, LEGATO, was founded as an organisation of Turkish university students, graduates and academicians, with its first office at Middle East Technical University in Ankara. The organisation continued to grow with other branches in numerous other universities and a reported 2000 members. In March 2007, LGBT students organised for the first time as a student club (Gökkuşağı – in English: rainbow) and Club Gökkuşağı was officially approved by Bilgi University.

In June 2003, the first public LGBT pride march in Turkey's history, organised by Lambdaistanbul, was held at Istiklal Avenue. In July 2005, KAOS GL applied to the Ministry of Interior Affairs and gained legal recognition, becoming the first LGBT organisation in the country with legal status. In September of the same year, a lawsuit by the Governor of Ankara was filed to cancel this legal status, but the demand was rejected by the prosecutor. In August 2006, the gay march in Bursa organised by the Rainbow Group'', officially approved by the Governor's Office, was cancelled due to large-scale public protests by an organised group of citizens.

The organisations actively participate in HIV/AIDS education programs and May Day parades.

In September 2005, the Ankara Governor's Office accused KAOS GL of "establishing an organisation that is against the laws and principles of morality." It also attempted in July 2006 to close the human rights group Pink Life LGBT Association (Pembe Hayat), which works with transgender people, claiming to prosecutors that the association opposed "morality and family structure." Both charges were ultimately dropped.

In 2006, Lambda Istanbul was evicted from its premises as the landlady was not happy with the fact that the organisation was promoting LGBT rights. In 2008, a court case was launched to close down Lambda Istanbul, and although a lower court initially decided in favour of closing down the association, the decision was overruled by the Turkish Constitutional Court and Lambda Istanbul remains open.

On June 10, 2018, the 6th İzmir Pride was held in Alsancak. Around 50,000 of LGBT members, allies, and human rights supporters participated at the Pride, walking along the waterfront street, Kordon. It started on Kıbrıs Şehitleri Avune and it ended in front of Türkan Saylan Cultural Center.

In April 2019, Ankara court lifted a ban on LGBT events in Turkey's capital. It is reported that it was Turkish LGBT+ rights group KAOS GL who managed to get it appealed after being unsuccessful last year.

In September 2022, thousands of anti-LGBTQ demonstrators marched in Istanbul, demanding the censoring of LGBTQ organizations and the banning of their activities.

Istanbul Pride

Istanbul Pride is a gay pride march and LGBT demonstration held annually in Turkey's biggest city, Istanbul. The event first took place in 2003 and now occurs each year on either the last Sunday of June or the first Sunday of July, to mark the end of Istanbul pride week. About 30 people took part in the first Gay Pride Istanbul. The numbers have increased exponentially each year, reaching roughly 5,000 people by 2010. The 2011 gathering attracted over 10,000 people, therefore making Gay Pride Istanbul the biggest march of its kind in the Muslim World. The 2012 pride march, which took place on 1 July, attracted between 10,000 and 30,000 people.

Participants assemble in Taksim Square before marching the entire length of İstiklal Avenue. This is a wide pedestrian boulevard and one of Istanbul's most important public spaces, the frequent home of bayram and regional festivals.

On 30 June 2013, the pride parade attracted almost 100,000 people. The protesters were joined by Gezi Park protesters, making the 2013 Istanbul Pride the biggest pride ever held in Turkey. The 2014 pride attracted more than 100,000 people. The European Union praised Turkey that the parade went ahead without disruption. On Sunday 29 June 2015, Reuters reported that Turkish police used a water cannon to disperse the gay pride parade 

In 2016, the pride march was banned by the local government "for the safety of our citizens, first and foremost the participants’, and for public order.". LGBT organizations have also not been allowed to make a press statement. The governorate of Istanbul once again claimed that a gathering of LGBT would not be allowed. "Within Law No: 5442, this request has not been approved due to the terror attacks that have taken place in our country and the area; because provocative acts and events may take place when the sensitivities that have emerged in society are taken into account; and because it may cause a disruption in public order and the people's- including the participants of the event- tranquility, security, and welfare."

In 2017 the Istanbul Governor’s Office yet again banned the LGBT Pride Parade, citing security concerns and public order.

In 2018, for the fourth consecutive year the Istanbul Governor’s Office yet again banned the LGBT Pride Parade, citing security concerns and public order, but around 1,000 people defied the ban, they were met with tear gas and rubber bullets. 11 participants were arrested.

In 2019, for the fifth consecutive year the Istanbul Governor’s Office yet again banned the LGBT Pride Parade, citing security concerns and public order. subsequently, opposition Member of the Grand National Assembly Sezgin Tanrıkulu of the Republican People's Party (CHP) lodged a parliamentary question to the Vice President of Turkey Fuat Oktay asking why the deputy governor of Istanbul had banned Istanbul Pride. He also asked how many LGBT members had been killed in the last 17 years, the time the ruling party Justice and Development Party (AKP) ruled the city, due to provocative hate speech, and raised concerns over discrimination against the LGBT community. On 29 June, hundreds of people defied the ban, they were met with tear gas, shields, pepper gas and plastic bullets from the Police.

In June 2022, a small pride march was organized in Istanbul despite the ban. More than 360 people were subsequently arrested, according to the event's organizers.

Summary table

See also

LGBT rights in Europe
LGBT rights in Asia
LGBT rights in Northern Cyprus
Timeline of LGBT history in Turkey
Human rights in Turkey
Accession of Turkey to the European Union
Hande Kader
Istanbul Convention#Turkey's withdrawal of the convention
Pink certificate

Further reading

References

Further reading

External links

Lambdaistanbul LGBT Solidarity Association, Istanbul-based LGBT association
Gladt e.V. – Gays & Lesbians aus der Türkei (based in Berlin / Germany)
Turkey LGBTI Equal Rights Association for Western Balkans and Turkey
Turk Gay Club, Turkish LGBT Community.
Istanbul: Asia meets Europe and Ancient meets modern, a gay.com travelogue of Istanbul, including a comprehensive review of gay clubs and tips.
LGBTI News Turkey, English-only LGBTI news website.
lgbti.org, LGBTI Union in Turkey
hevilgbti.org, HEVI LGBTI+ Association. 
lgbtifm.com, LGBTI Radio Station in Turkey
news.lgbti.org LGBTI News in English